Statesmen of Jazz was a swing jazz group started in 1994 by the American Federation of Jazz Societies.

The group performs as a sextet, but it has a rotating, all-star membership comprising about thirty musicians. The group released its first album in 1994 for Arbors Records, performed at the Sacramento Jazz Jubilee in 1995, and toured Japan in 1997.

When the group started, all of its members were over the age of sixty-five.

Members
 Louie Bellson
 Bill Berry (trumpeter)
 Keter Betts
 Bob Cranshaw
 Kenny Davern
 Buddy DeFranco
 Panama Francis
 Johnny Frigo
 Wycliffe Gordon
 Al Grey
 Milt Hinton
 Red Holloway
 Jane Jarvis
 Jay Leonhart
 Eddie Locke
 Dennis Mackrel
 George Masso
 Earl May
 Ken Peplowski
 Houston Person
 Bucky Pizzarelli
 Ed Polcer
 Benny Powell
 Don Sickler
 Norman Simmons
 Carrie Smith
 Derek Smith
 Irvin Stokes
 Buddy Tate
 Clark Terry
 Warren Vache
 Johnny Varro
 Frank Wess
 Benny Waters
 Joe Wilder
 Spiegle Willcox
 Claude Williams

Discography
 Statesmen of Jazz (Arbors, 1994)
 A Multitude of Stars (Arbors, 2004)

References

American jazz ensembles
Jazz supergroups
Arbors Records artists